The De Vere East Midlands Conference Centre is a commercially run conference facility on the University Park Campus of the University of Nottingham in England.

External links

De Vere East Midlands Conference Centre

Buildings and structures in Nottinghamshire
Exhibition and conference centres in England
University of Nottingham